Ljan Church is a parish church of the Church of Norway in the district of Nordstrand in Oslo, Norway.

The church was consecrated on 10 April 1932 and is shrouded by pine trees on a hill. Later a parish center was built just below. The architectural style is neo-Romanesque and medieval inspired. There are no signs of modernism. The architect was Olav Olson (1879-1945). 

It is a relatively small church in stone. The church tower is at the entrance. The choir is narrow. It has two sacristies. The roof is covered with copper plates. Sculptor Trygve Dammen (1900-1973) made the pulpit and baptismal font, a wooden sculpture and created wooden sculptures under the ceiling. There are stained glass in all the windows, composed by artist Rolf Klemetsrud (1900-1956). Wrought Iron works in windows and altar ring is by Karl Bilgrei (1898-1990). The crucifix over the main entrance is made by Halfdan Davidsen.  The two church bells are made by Olsen Nauen Bell Foundry in Tønsberg.

Ljan Church is listed as protected by the Norwegian Directorate for Cultural Heritage.

References

External links
 Official website

Lutheran churches in Oslo
Churches completed in 1932
1932 establishments in Norway
20th-century Church of Norway church buildings
Art Nouveau church buildings in Norway